Charles Albert Brougher (June 19, 1824 - November 25, 1891) was an American politician. He was the 14th and 16th Secretary of State of Mississippi, serving from 1860 to 1865 and 1865 to 1869.

Biography 
Charles Albert Brougher was born on June 19, 1824, in Morgan County, Alabama. He was the son of Frederick, who represented Tippah County in the Mississippi State Senate from 1842 to 1844, and Mary Ann Brougher. Charles graduated from Pennsylvania College (now Gettysburg College) in 1846. He then taught from 1846 to 1849. He read law in Ripley, Mississippi, and was admitted to the bar in 1852. Brougher was appointed to the office of Secretary of State of Mississippi on January or April 16, 1860, to fill in the vacancy left by the death of Secretary of State B. R. Webb, who died on January 16, 1860, only 6 days after he was appointed. Brougher was re-elected in October 1863. His tenure in office ended when Union Army colonel Alexander Warner was appointed Secretary of State by the military in June 1865. After Warner's removal from the office in August 1865, Brougher was re-elected to the office in October of the same year. He served until the appointment of Henry Musgrove in September 1869. Brougher died of an unknown disease in his home in Jackson, Mississippi, at 3 PM on November 25, 1891.

Personal life 
Brougher married Marie Louisa Earle on May 23, 1857. Brougher was the paternal grandfather of U. S. Army brigadier general William E. Brougher.

References 

1824 births
1891 deaths
Secretaries of State of Mississippi
People from Jackson, Mississippi
People from Morgan County, Alabama